Norcott is a surname. Notable people by that name include:

 William Norcott (satirist) (1770–1820), Irish lawyer and satirist.
 Geoff Norcott (born 1976), English comedian.
 Amos Norcott (1777–1838), British soldier.
 Charles Norcott (1849-1931), British soldier.
 William Norcott (1804–1886), British soldier.
 Flemming L. Norcott Jr. (born 1943), American judge.